Light is a single-member electoral district for the South Australian House of Assembly. Light is named after Colonel William Light (1786 – 1839), who was the first Surveyor-General of South Australia. The electorate was created in 1857, abolished at the 1902 election and recreated at the 1938 election. It is based on the semi-rural township of Gawler, and stretches southwards into the outermost northern suburbs of Adelaide.

Covering a total area of 62.36 km², Light consists of the suburbs of Buchfelde, Evanston Gardens, Evanston Park, Evanston South, Gawler, Gawler East, Gawler South, Gawler West, Hewett, Hillier, Kudla, Munno Para, Munno Para Downs, Munno Para West, Reid, and Willaston. Although growing urbanisation in recent years has resulted in Adelaide's growth spilling into Gawler, Light is classed as a rural electorate.

The electorate was held by the Liberal Party and its predecessor, the Liberal and Country League, for all but one term from its re-creation in 1938 until 2006. For most of that time, it was a fairly safe to safe LCL/Liberal seat.

A redistribution prior to the 2002 election pushed Light further into the outer Adelaide suburbs, paring back the margin from a fairly safe 6.3 percent to an extremely marginal 1.1 percent. At the 2002 election, Liberal incumbent Malcolm Buckby picked up a small swing in his favour and retained the electorate even as the Liberals lost government. In 2006 Tony Piccolo became the second Labor member to win the electorate, and the first Labor member for the electorate in 62 years. At the 2010 election he increased his margin against the statewide trend and decades of voting patterns in the seat, and became the first Labor member to be re-elected to Light. His victory was one of two that allowed Labor to hold onto a narrow majority despite losing the two-party vote.

A redistribution prior to the 2014 election reduced Labor's margin significantly from 5.3 percent to 2.8 percent, but Labor again retained the electorate with an unchanged margin. After a redistribution slightly increased the Labor margin to 5.4 percent, Piccolo retained the seat in 2018 with a healthy swing of almost six percent, enough to make Light a fairly safe Labor seat (and just on the edge of being safe). This came even as Labor lost government, marking only the second time that the conservatives won government without holding Light.

The electorate's first member in its current incarnation as a single-member seat was Premier and LCL founder Richard Layton Butler, who held the electorate for a few months in 1938 before making an unsuccessful attempt to transfer to federal politics. Other particularly notable members include Bruce Eastick, leader of the LCL/Liberals from 1972 to 1975 and Speaker of the South Australian House of Assembly during the Tonkin government.

Members

Election results

Notes

References
 ECSA profile for Light: 2018
 ABC profile for Light: 2018
 Poll Bludger profile for Light: 2018

Electoral districts of South Australia
1857 establishments in Australia
1902 disestablishments in Australia
1938 establishments in Australia